Claude Chartre (born December 21, 1949) is a Canadian retired professional ice hockey centre. He played in 18 WHA games with the New York Raiders, New York Golden Blades, Jersey Knights, Michigan Stags, and Baltimore Blades over parts of three seasons.

External links

1949 births
Baltimore Blades players
Canadian ice hockey centres
Hampton Gulls (AHL) players
Hampton Gulls (SHL) players
Living people
Michigan Stags players
Jersey Knights players
New York Golden Blades players
New York Raiders players
Philadelphia Flyers draft picks
Quebec Aces (AHL) players
San Diego Mariners (PHL) players